Just Before I Go, previously entitled Hello I Must Be Going, is a 2014 American black comedy drama film directed by Courteney Cox, in her second directorial effort (following her debut with the Lifetime original film TalhotBlond), from a screenplay written by David Flebotte, starring Seann William Scott, Elisha Cuthbert, Olivia Thirlby, Garret Dillahunt, and Kate Walsh.

The film premiered at the Tribeca Film Festival on April 24, 2014, and it was released in select theaters on April 24, 2015.

Plot
After his wife leaves him, Ted Morgan spirals into depression and decides to commit suicide. First, he wants to tie up some loose ends. He moves in with his brother Lucky and his family, and confronts his elderly seventh grade teacher, who made his life hell - even though she is suffering from dementia in a home for the elderly. He meets her granddaughter Greta. He confides his plan to her and she takes an interest. She wants to document his life leading up to his suicide. He then confronts his childhood bully, Rawly, who apologizes for the way he treated Ted  and wants to make amends. He finds out that his wife died of an aneurysm, leaving him behind with a mentally disabled child. They become friends. He sleeps with his high school crush Vickie, who is married with five children. She leaves her family for him, but he eventually tells her he doesn't want a relationship, which hurts her deeply. Ted's nephew Zeke comes out to him as gay and confides that he is afraid that his father would disown him if he knew. Ted comforts Greta after her grandmother dies, and she tries to kiss him. He backs away, however, reminding her that he will be dead soon. She gets angry, and accuses him "running away". He learns her mother committed suicide, which is why she was interested in his story. After a violent argument with his secret boyfriend, Zeke goes to kill himself by jumping off a cliff. Ted and the rest of the family try to talk him down, but he slips and falls off the cliff. Ted and Lucky jump after him, saving the boy's life.  Ted is knocked unconscious, and has a dream in which his long-dead father tells him how important living is. With a new lease on life, Ted decides to stay in town, with Greta, and surrounded by his family and friends, both old and new.

Cast
 Seann William Scott as Ted Morgan
 Olivia Thirlby as Greta
 Garret Dillahunt as Lucky Morgan
 Kate Walsh as Kathleen Morgan
 Kyle Gallner as Zeke Morgan
 Rob Riggle as Rawly Stansfield
 Evan Ross as Romeo Semple
 Cleo King as Berta
 Missi Pyle as Officer CT
 Elisha Cuthbert as Penny Morgan
 Mackenzie Marsh as Vickie
 Connie Stevens as Nancy Morgan
 David Arquette as Albert, Vickie's husband
 Clancy Brown as Ted's father
 Jack Quaid as Dylan

Release
The premiere took place at the 2014 Tribeca Film Festival. The film was released in select theaters on April 24, 2015, before a video on demand, digital store, DVD and Blu-ray release on May 12, 2015.

Reception
Rotten Tomatoes, a review aggregator, reports that 9% of 11 surveyed critics gave the film a positive review; the average rating was 1.9/10. Metacritic rated it 24/100 based on six reviews.

Justin Chang of Variety called it "a dismal, tonally disastrous small-town farce". Frank Scheck of The Hollywood Reporter described it as "a serious misfire" whose tonal shifts would be difficult for a veteran director to manage. Ethan Alter of Film Journal International wrote, "Cox must have seen something in this screenplay that encouraged her to film it, but whatever that critical element was, it’s not apparent in the finished product." Stephen Holden of The New York Times wrote that the film "lurches along a wobbly line between salacious comic nastiness and nauseating sentimentality" without properly integrating them into a cohesive whole. Joe Neumaier of the New York Daily News wrote: "Courteney Cox's misbegotten project is a comedy-drama that, to Cox's credit, doesn't feel at all like a TV sitcom. The former "Friends" star clearly wanted something special, but sadly the result is ... this." In one of the few positive reviews the film received, Gary Goldstein of the Los Angeles Times wrote, "Anchored by a nicely understated performance by Seann William Scott, Just Before I Go effectively juggles a wealth of genuine, at times profound, emotion with quite a bit of nutty-raunchy humor."

References

External links
 

2014 films
2014 black comedy films
2014 comedy-drama films
2014 LGBT-related films
2014 independent films
American black comedy films
American comedy-drama films
American independent films
American LGBT-related films
Films shot in Los Angeles
Films about suicide
2014 directorial debut films
2014 comedy films
Films scored by Erran Baron Cohen
Gay-related films
2010s English-language films
2010s American films